Gomanj-e Sofla (also Romanized as Gomānj-e Soflá and Gamanj Sofla; also known as Gamān, Gomānāb Pā’īn, Gomāneh Āshāqī, Gomānj-e Pā’īn, Gomānj Pā’īn, Gomyānāb Ashāqī, Gumianāb Ashāghi, Gyumyanab-Ashagy, Kamānj, Kamānj-e Pā’īn, Kamānj-e Soflá, Komanch Pā’īn, and Komānj Pā’īn) is a village in Esperan Rural District, in the Central District of Tabriz County, East Azerbaijan Province, Iran. At the 2006 census, its population was 377, in 96 families.

References 

Populated places in Tabriz County